José Luis Sinisterra Castillo (born 23 July 1998) is a Colombian professional footballer who plays as a winger for Deportivo Pereira.

Career
Sinisterra's youth career started with Sporting de Buenaventura, prior to leaving Colombia at the age of 14 to join Palmeiras. His stay lasted one year, preceding further spells in Brazil with Santos and Corinthians. After departing the latter, Sinisterra moved to Argentina where he played for the academies of Defensa y Justicia, Quilmes and Lanús; during which time he also had a trial with River Plate. He then had a period back in Colombia with Atlético Nacional, which occurred before a move to Spain's Valladolid B. Sinisterra's senior career began with Valladolid B, making his debut in Segunda División B versus Guijuelo in September 2016.

He made a further twelve appearances for the Spanish club in the 2016–17 campaign. He appeared as an unused substitute on five occasions in the following season, 2017–18, though failed to make an appearance, subsequently departing at the end of 2017. In January 2018, Sinisterra rejoined Lanús of Argentine Primera División. His professional debut arrived on 7 October against Atlético Tucumán, which preceded his first goal two weeks later versus Patronato. After eight appearances for Lanús, Sinisterra departed in January 2020 on loan to Primera B Nacional's Platense.

After a spell at San Martín de Tucumán in 2021, Sinisterra returned to Colombia in January 2022, when he signed with Deportivo Pereira.

Career statistics
.

References

External links

1998 births
Living people
People from Buenaventura, Valle del Cauca
Colombian footballers
Colombian expatriate footballers
Association football wingers
Colombia youth international footballers
Sociedade Esportiva Palmeiras players
Santos FC players
Sport Club Corinthians Paulista players
Defensa y Justicia footballers
Quilmes Atlético Club footballers
Atlético Nacional footballers
Real Valladolid Promesas players
Club Atlético Lanús footballers
Club Atlético Platense footballers
San Martín de Tucumán footballers
Deportivo Pereira footballers
Segunda División B players
Argentine Primera División players
Primera Nacional players
Colombian expatriate sportspeople in Brazil
Colombian expatriate sportspeople in Spain
Colombian expatriate sportspeople in Argentina
Expatriate footballers in Brazil
Expatriate footballers in Spain
Expatriate footballers in Argentina
Sportspeople from Valle del Cauca Department